La planta insolente is a 2017 film directed by Venezuelan director Román Chalbaud. The film depicts the tenure of Venezuelan President Cipriano Castro. The movie was a box-office flop and received generally negative reviews from critics.

Plot 
The film depicts the tenure of Venezuelan President Cipriano Castro, and the title is based on his quote: "The insolent plant of the foreigner has desecrated the sacred soil of the fatherland", his response to the Venezuelan crisis of 1902–1903, when European nations blockaded Venezuelan shores after Castro refused to pay foreign debts and damages.

Production 
The idea for the movie stated in 2009 when, during the premiere of Zamora: Tierra y hombres libres, President Hugo Chávez suggested to make a film about Cipriano Castro to Chalbaud and Luis Britto García, both of which had worked in the film as director and screenwriter, respectively.

Cast

Release 
The movie was a box-office flop, failing to recoup the funds invested. The theaters where it was screened were empty and it was quickly withdrawn.

Reception 

Venezuelan film critic Sergio Monsalve said that the movie, along with Chalbaud's late work El Caracazo, Días de poder and Zamora: Tierra y hombres libres, tarnished Chalbaud's career and accomplishments as a filmmaker, saying that they were produced to please the Bolivarian Revolution and the ruling party, and panned the film.

Writing for Revista Florencia, Crissia Contreras criticized several aspects of the film, particularly its script and visual effects. Crissia also stated that the movie's special effects were bad, suggesting that the country's film production was far from acceptable standards, and that extras, and even main actors, failed to depict fundamental aspects of the  Liberal Restorative army, such as the Andean accents.

References

External links 

 
 La planta insolente in FilmAffinity

2017 films
Venezuelan drama films
Films set in 1902
2010s Spanish-language films
Films directed by Román Chalbaud